Paulinho is a Portuguese nickname for people named Paulo (Paulo -inho, little Paulo).  People known as Paulinho include:

Music
Paulinho da Costa (born 1948), Brazilian percussionist
Paulinho da Viola (born 1942), Brazilian sambista
Paulinho Moska (born 1967), Brazilian composer
Paulinho Nogueira (1929–2003), Brazilian guitarist
Paulo César dos Santos (1952–2020), Brazilian vocalist of Roupa Nova

Portuguese sportsmen

Football
Paulinho (footballer, born 1966) (Paulo José Ramos Mendes)
Paulinho Santos (born 1970) (João Paulo Maio dos Santos)
Paulinho (footballer, born 1985) (Paulo Dinarte Gouveia Pestana)
Paulinho (footballer, born July 1988) (José Paulo Bezerra Maciel)
Paulinho (footballer, born 1991) (Paulo Sérgio Mota)
Paulinho (footballer, born March 1992) (Paulo Jorge Almeida Silva)
Paulinho (footballer, born November 1992) (João Paulo Dias Fernandes)
Paulinho (footballer, born December 1997) (Paulo Manuel Neves Alves)
Paulinho (footballer, born August 2000) (Paulo Miguel Gomes Ferreira)

Futsal
Paulinho (futsal player) (born 1983), full name Paulo Jorge Camões Martins, futsal player

Brazilian sportsmen

Football
Paulinho Ferreira (born 1940)
Paulinho (footballer, born 1958) (Paulo Luiz Massariol)
Paulinho Cascavel (born 1959) 
Paulinho Criciúma (born 1961) 
Paulinho McLaren (born 1963)
Paulinho Kobayashi (born 1970)
Paulinho (footballer, born 1975) (Paulo Benedito Bonifácio Maximiano)
Paulinho Guará (born 1979) 
Paulinho (footballer, born 1981) (Paulo Cesar Rodriguez)
Paulinho (footballer, born 1982) (Paulo Antonio de Oliveira)
Paulinho (footballer, born January 1983) (Paulo Robspierry Carreiro)
Paulinho (footballer, born August 1983) (Paulo Roberto Teles Goes Sobrinho)
Paulinho (footballer, born January 1986) (Paulo Sérgio Betanin)
Paulinho Guerreiro (born March 1986)
Paulinho (footballer, born 5 May 1988)
Paulinho Dias (born 13 May 1988)
Paulinho (footballer, born June 1988) (Paulo Luiz Beraldo Santos)
Paulinho (footballer, born July 1988) (José Paulo Bezerra Maciel Júnior)
Paulinho Le Petit (born 1989)
Paulinho (footballer, born January 1989) (Paulo Roberto Gonzaga)
Paulinho (footballer, born May 1989) (Paulo Sérgio de Oliveira)
Paulinho (footballer, born January 1993) (Paulo Modesto da Silva Júnior)
Paulinho (footballer, born May 1993) (Paulo Victor de Menezes Melo)
Paulinho Moccelin (born 1994) 
Paulinho (footballer, born 1994) (Paulo Henrique Soares dos Santos)
Paulinho (footballer, born 1995) (Paulo Victor da Silva)
Paulinho (footballer, born January 1997) (Paulo Lucas Santos de Paula)
Paulinho (footballer, born August 1997) (Paulo Henrique Rolim de Genova)
Paulinho (footballer, born 1998) (Paulo Henrique Pereira da Silva)
Paulinho (footballer, born July 2000) (Paulo Henrique Sampaio Filho)

Basketball
Paulinho Boracini (born 1984)

Others
Paulinho Paiakan, Brazilian indigenous leader

See also
 
Paul (disambiguation)
Paulão
Paulo
Palhinha

Portuguese masculine given names